Walter Waring (1726-1780), was a British politician who sat in the House of Commons between  1755 and 1780.

Waring was the son of Robert and Elizabeth Waring of Owlbury, Shropshire being baptised in December 1726 at Bishop's Castle. He was educated at Shrewsbury School and was admitted at St. John’s College, Cambridge on 8 April 1745, aged 18.

In 1755 Waring was returned as Member of Parliament for Bishops Castle through his residence at Owlbury. He is not known to have voted or made any speech during this Parliament. He married Hannah Ranby, daughter of John Ranby, serjeant surgeon to King George II on 18 July 1758. In 1759, he vacated his seat and arranged for Henry Grenville to take his place, in order, it seems, to raise money. Subsequently, his father in law encouraged him to stand at Bishops Castle again in 1763. Lord Clive offered to pay his expenses if he stood down as he was bound to lose, and in due course he did lose to Clive’s nephew.

In 1768 Waring unsuccessfully contested Coventry.  He inherited the estate at Groton, Suffolk from his cousin Thomas Waring in 1769. The estate was considerable, and in 1773 he was returned unopposed as Member of Parliament for Coventry. He contested Coventry successfully in the 1774 British general election but appears to have made little or no contribution in parliament.

Waring died at the beginning of February 1780 and was buried at Groton.

References

Sources

Portrait of Hannah, Daughter of John Ranby Snr c.1748–50 by William Hogarth

1780 deaths
Politicians from Shropshire
People educated at Shrewsbury School
Alumni of St John's College, Cambridge
British MPs 1754–1761
British MPs 1768–1774
British MPs 1774–1780
Members of the Parliament of Great Britain for English constituencies
Members of Parliament for Coventry
1726 births